Bakerville is an unincorporated community in Jefferson County, Illinois, United States.

References

Unincorporated communities in Jefferson County, Illinois
Unincorporated communities in Illinois